Elections to Oxfordshire County Council were held on Thursday, 5 May 1977, when the whole council of sixty-nine members was up for election.

The result was that the Conservatives retained their control, winning sixty-one seats, a gain of eight. Labour ended with only three county councillors, a loss of seventeen, Independents also held three, a loss of six, while the Liberals held the two seats they had had.

Election result

|}

References

1977
Oxfordshire
20th century in Oxfordshire